Gerlind Plonka-Hoch is a German applied mathematician specializing in signal processing and image processing, and known for her work on refinable functions and curvelets. She is a professor at the University of Göttingen, in the Institute for Numerical and Applied Mathematics.

Plonka earned her Ph.D. from the University of Rostock in 1993.
Her dissertation, Periodische Lagrange- und Hermite-Spline-Interpolation,
concerned polynomial interpolation using Lagrange polynomials and Hermite splines, and was supervised by Manfred Tasche.

She was the Emmy Noether Lecturer of the German Mathematical Society in 2016.

Book
 with

References

External links
Home page

Year of birth missing (living people)
Living people
20th-century German mathematicians
Women mathematicians
Academic staff of the University of Göttingen
21st-century German mathematicians